Andreas Bauer (born September 15, 1985) is an Austrian footballer who currently plays as a defender for Team Wiener Linien.

References

External links
 
 bundesliga.at profile 

1985 births
Living people
Austrian footballers
Floridsdorfer AC players
FC Lustenau players
SK Rapid Wien players
Place of birth missing (living people)
Association football defenders